ABM Golam Mustafa is a Bangladesh Nationalist Party politician and the former Member of Parliament of Faridpur-1.

Career
Mustafa was elected to parliament from Faridpur-1 as a Bangladesh Nationalist Party candidate in 1979.

References

Bangladesh Nationalist Party politicians
Living people
2nd Jatiya Sangsad members
Year of birth missing (living people)